Shepherd Murape is a Zimbabwean former football player and the current manager of the Zimbabwe national football team.

Career
Murape played club football for Harare side Dynamos F.C. and for the Zimbabwe national football team.

In 1976, he became a player-manager for Dynamos, and helped lead the club to several league titles. He went on to manage newly formed Black Rhinos F.C. in 1983.

Murape has had stints with QwaQwa Stars F.C., Real Rovers F.C., AmaZulu F.C., Moroka Swallows F.C., Black Leopards F.C., Orlando Pirates F.C. and Manning Rangers F.C. in South Africa. He led Blue Waters F.C. to the Namibian league title in 2004.

Murape managed the Zimbabwe national football team during 1981. In 1994, he became the first person to manage Namibia national football team following its independence.

Murape was appointed manager of South African National First Division club Magesi in October 2016.

References

External links

Living people
Zimbabwean footballers
Zimbabwe international footballers
Zimbabwean football managers
Zimbabwe national football team managers
Namibia national football team managers
Association footballers not categorized by position
Year of birth missing (living people)
Zimbabwean expatriate football managers